Biscoe Islands is a series of islands, of which the principal ones are Renaud, Lavoisier (named Serrano by Chile and Mitre by Argentina), Watkins, Krogh, Pickwick and Rabot, lying parallel to the west coast of Graham Land and extending  between Southwind Passage on the northeast and Matha Strait on the southwest. Another group of islands are the Adolph Islands.

The islands are named for John Biscoe, the commander of a British expedition which explored the islands in February 1832.

See also 

 Bates Island
 Composite Antarctic Gazetteer
 List of Antarctic islands south of 60° S
 SCAR
 Southwind Passage
 Territorial claims in Antarctica

References

 
Archipelagoes of the Southern Ocean
Islands of Antarctica